Hippolyta is a fictional Amazon character appearing in American comic books published by Marvel Comics. Created by Stan Lee and Jack Kirby, the character first appeared  in Thor #127 (April 1966). Hippolyta is the daughter of Ares, the God of War.

Publication history

Based on the Hippolyta of Greek mythology, the character first appeared in Thor #127 (April 1966) and was created by Stan Lee and Jack Kirby.

Fictional character biography
Hippolyta is the daughter of the Greek god of war Ares and Otrera, and she is the step-sister to Phobos. She and her sister Amazons would help create war, stealing the female children in the process in order to make their armies grow. The group protected the cow-goddess Io as a favor to her grandfather Zeus.

After many years of ruling the Amazons, Hippolyta eventually met Hercules when he, Jason, and the Argonauts landed near her city stronghold of Themiscyra. There they attempted to steal Hippolyta's enchanted girdle and any slaves they could along the way. Fearful for her sister's life, Hippolyta's sister Antiope willingly disguised herself as Hippolyta. Jason, thinking her to be the Amazon queen, kidnapped Antiope and made her his bride. She eventually bore a son to him, Hippolytus, whom Antiope named after her much loved sister. Initially resenting Hercules for the initial invasion, Hippolyta eventually fell in love with him. Over the centuries, she tried various attempts to win his affection, but ultimately he never gave her his heart. Thus a love/hate relationship was formed between the two.

As shown in a Howard the Duck story, Hippolyta has historically been one of the bearers of the Amulet of Pazuzu. As the Howard the Duck comic involves storylines that are both in and out of continuity, it is unclear if the Amulet of Pazuzu truly exists in the Marvel Universe.

In her first modern-day appearance Hippolyta helped Pluto, Roman god of the dead, in his plan to avenge himself on Hercules by posing as a movie actress and tricking the hero into signing a "movie contract" that in reality bound him to Pluto's realm, Hades, while Pluto was disguised as the director. When Hercules was given the contract she told him that in the film he conquered the Netherworld by defeating Pluto and she remained by his side all the time, causing him to sign the contract. She then revealed who she really was to Hercules. But Thor came to his aid, and the heroes caused so much damage to Hades that Pluto himself broke the contract just to be rid of them.

Hippolyta also formed a new generation of Amazons from female runaways in New York City called the Bacchae. The group has clashed with such heroes as the Fantastic Four and the X-Men.

Much later, Hippolyta reappeared in the pages of The Incredible Hercules, visiting her father Ares in an attempt to rally him to one of Hera's new schemes. Ares rebuffs her, however, and when Hippolyta returns, she is murdered by her daughter Artume, who is tired of her mother's obsession with Hercules. During the Dark Reign storyline, Hippolyta is among the dead people in Erebus when Hercules travels to the Underworld.

Hela later brings Hippolyta (under the moniker "Warrior Woman") from the Underworld to help the Valkyrior defeat the Doommaidens. Hippolyta then joins Valkyrie's Fearless Defenders as a full-time member of this group.

During the Monsters Unleashed storyline, Valkyrie and Hippolyta are seen fighting the Leviathon Tide monsters in Edinburgh.

Powers, abilities, and equipment
As a human/Olympian hybrid, Hippolyta has immense strength, stamina, durability, speed, agility, reflexes, and healing, as well as virtual immortality. She is a highly skilled unarmed combatant and possesses the Gauntlet of Ares, which increases her physical powers a hundredfold. Hippolyta also has access to various melee weapons.

Reception

Accolades 
 In 2021, CBR.com ranked Hippolyta 8th in their "Marvel: 10 Most Powerful Olympians" list.
 In 2022, Sportskeeda ranked Hippolyta 8th in their "10 best Greek gods from Marvel comics " list.

Other versions

JLA/Avengers crossover
Indirect reference was made to this version of Hippolyta in the JLA/Avengers crossover series. At one point, an angry Wonder Woman confronted Hercules, due to the Heracles of her reality having once beaten and humiliated her mother, the Hippolyta of the DC Universe, while under a spell induced by Hera and co-opted by Ares. Her rage grew greater still when Hercules clumsily joked that his relations with the Marvel Universe Hippolyta had been much different.

In other media
Hippolyta appears in the "Thor" segment of The Marvel Super Heroes.

References

External links
 
 Hippolyta at Marvel.com

Characters created by Jack Kirby
Characters created by Stan Lee
Comics characters introduced in 1966
Fictional characters with immortality
Fictional characters with superhuman durability or invulnerability
Fictional Greek people
Fictional queens
Marvel Comics Amazons
Marvel Comics characters who can move at superhuman speeds
Marvel Comics characters with accelerated healing
Marvel Comics characters with superhuman strength
Marvel Comics female supervillains